Knoutsodonta tridactila is a species of sea slug, a dorid nudibranch, a shell-less marine gastropod mollusc in the family Onchidorididae.

Distribution
This species was described from Verdicio, Asturias, on the Atlantic Ocean coast of Spain, . Additional specimens were found nearby at El Puntal, .

Description
Knoutsodonta tridactila is similar in appearance to Knoutsodonta depressa but is distinguished by having a rhinophore sheath with three elongate tubercles, similar to the ones which cover the dorsal surface of the mantle.

Diet
This species was found on the bryozoan Schizomavella linearis which is a food also reported for Knoutsodonta depressa.

References

Onchidorididae
Gastropods described in 1982